Canada has sent athletes to every Winter Olympic Games and almost every Summer Olympic Games since its debut at the 1900 games with the exception of the 1980 Summer Olympics, which it boycotted. Canada has won at least one medal at every Olympics in which it has competed.  The Canadian Olympic Committee (COC) is the National Olympic Committee for Canada.

At the 2010 Winter Olympics, which was hosted in Vancouver, British Columbia, Canada, the country won more gold medals than any other competing nation for the first time.

Hosted Games

Canada has hosted the Olympic games three times: the 1976 Summer Olympics in Montreal, the 1988 Winter Olympics in Calgary, and the 2010 Winter Olympics in Vancouver.

Unsuccessful bids

Future bids
Stakeholders from Vancouver and a group from Québec City have both expressed interest in their respective cities hosting the 2030 Winter Olympics.

Medal tables

Summer games

Winter games

Records
In 2012, Equestrian show jumper Ian Millar competed at his tenth Summer Olympics, tying the record for most Olympic games participated in set by Austrian sailor Hubert Raudaschl between 1964 and 1996. He has been named to eleven straight Olympic teams, but did not compete at the 1980 Summer Olympics due to the Canadian boycott. In 2008 he won his first medal, a silver medal in the team jumping event.

Clara Hughes is the inaugural and only Olympian of any country or gender, to win medals all Olympic Games: two Summer and four Winter medals. Cindy Klassen and Charles Hamelin hold the record for most Winter medals won by a Canadian, with six apiece. Penny Oleksiak is the most decorated Canadian athlete to ever compete at the Summer Games, winning 7 medals. 

Catriona Le May Doan became the inaugural Canadian to defend their gold medal at the Olympics. She repeated her gold medal in the women's 500m long track speedskating event at the 2002 Salt Lake City Olympics from the 1998 Nagano Olympics.

Alexandre Bilodeau became the first freestyle skiing gold medallist to defend his Olympic title, and first repeat gold medallist, winning the men's moguls at the 2014 Sochi Winter Olympics. He became the second Canadian to defend their Olympic gold, and first man.

Trampoline gymnast Rosie MacLennan was the first Canadian to defend their gold medal in an individual sport at the Summer Olympics. She won gold at the 2012 and 2016 Summer Olympics, the inaugural Olympian to defend their title in that discipline.

After captaining the women's ice hockey team to gold at the 2014 Winter Olympics, Caroline Ouellette became the first Winter Olympian of any country or gender to enter four or more career events and win gold in each. Oullette had previously won gold in ice hockey in 2002, 2006, and 2010.

Jennifer Jones skipped the Canadian women's team at the 2014 Winter Olympics to a gold medal. She is the first ever female skip in Olympic history to be undefeated throughout the tournament. Jones, Kaitlyn Lawes, Jill Officer, Dawn McEwen and spare Kirsten Wall  went unbeaten with an 11-0 record defeating  China, Sweden (round-robin and finals), Great Britain (round-robin and semi-finals), Denmark, Switzerland, Japan, Russia, the United States, and Korea.

During the 2016 Summer Olympics, swimmer Penny Oleksiak became the inaugural Canadian of either gender to win four medals at a single Summer Games and the distinction of the country's youngest Olympic multiple medalist at the age of 16: a gold in the 100 m freestyle, a silver in the 100 m butterfly, and two bronzes in the women's freestyle relays (4 × 100 m and 4 × 200 m). She shares the distinction if being the co-inaugural Olympic medalist born in the 21st century when, in women's 4 × 100 m freestyle relay a few days earlier, won the bronze medal with teammate Taylor Ruck.

After capturing gold in 2010 Winter Olympics, Tessa Virtue and Scott Moir became the inaugural ice dancers from North America to win an Olympic gold medal, ending the 34-year streak of the Europeans. They were the inaugural ice dance team to win the Olympic gold at home ice and the inaugural ice dancers to win gold at their Olympic debut. They are the youngest pair to win an Olympic title at 20 and 22 respectively. They would win two more silver medals at the 2014 Winter Olympics and two more gold medals at the 2018 Winter Olympics, giving them the distinction of being the most decorated figure skaters at the Winter Games.

Broadcaster Richard Garneau covered 23 Olympic Games, more than any other journalist in the world, starting with Rome in 1960 to London in 2012, missing only the Atlanta and Nagano Games. The International Olympic Committee awarded him posthumously the Pierre de Coubertin medal in recognition of his exceptional service to the Olympic movement.

Top medal earners
Years in bolded text are Olympics at which that competitor won a medal.

3+ medals at one Olympics

See also

 List of flag bearers for Canada at the Olympics
 List of Canadian Summer Olympics gold medalists
 List of Olympic men's ice hockey players for Canada
 List of Olympic women's ice hockey players for Canada
 Canadian Olympic stamps
 Own the Podium
 Canada at the Paralympics

References

External links
 
 
 
 CBC Digital Archives - Olympics
 Olympics - TSN